Thomas Elrington may refer to:
Thomas Elrington (bishop) (1760–1835), bishop and provost of Trinity College, Dublin
Thomas Elrington (actor) (1688–1732), English actor
Thomas Elrington (MP) (1520–1566), Member of Parliament (MP) for Bramber, and for New Shoreham